The  is a railway line in Japan operated by East Japan Railway Company (JR East). It connects Oiwake Station in Akita, Akita Prefecture to Oga Station in Oga, Akita Prefecture.

Stations

Rolling stock
 
 
KiHa 40 series
EV-E801 series

History
This was extended to Wakimoto on 8 November 1914, to Hadachi on 1 December 1915, and to Funakawa (present-day Oga Station) on 16 December 1916.

A freight-only branch from Funakawa to Funakawaminato was opened on 10 June 1937.

On 1 April 1968, the line was renamed the Oga Line, coinciding with the renaming of Funakawa Station to Oga Station.

With the privatization of Japanese National Railways (JNR) on 1 April 1987, the line came under the control of JR East.

Recent developments

In spring 2017, a new EV-E801 series battery electric multiple unit train was introduced on the Oga Line service from Akita. A special recharging facility was built at Oga Station.

So far, there is only one battery electric trainset operated on this line, but in December 2019 JR East announced the plan to introduce additional such trainsets on this route after the fiscal year 2020, completely replacing KiHa 40 and 48 diesel multiple units.

This would make the Oga Line another non-electrified railway line in Japan where battery electric trains completely replaced diesel trains; this has already happened, for example, on the Kashii Line and the Karasuyama Line.

References

 
Lines of East Japan Railway Company
1067 mm gauge railways in Japan
Railway lines opened in 1913
1913 establishments in Japan